Beatrice of Portugal may refer to:

 Beatrice of Portugal (died 1381), daughter of Peter I of Portugal and Inês de Castro, married to Sancho Alfonso
 Beatrice, Countess of Arundel (c. 1386–1439), natural daughter of John I of Portugal and Inês Pires. 
 Beatrice of Portugal (1373–c. 1420), daughter of Ferdinand I of Portugal, married to John I of Castile and is considered by some historians to be the 10th Portuguese monarch
 Infanta Beatrice, Duchess of Viseu (1430–1506), mother of King Manuel I of Portugal
 Infanta Beatrice of Portugal (1504–1538) (1504–1538), daughter of Manuel I of Portugal and Maria of Aragon, and married to Charles III, Duke of Savoy
 Infanta Beatriz of Portugal (1530) (1530–1530), daughter of John III of Portugal